Wat Na Phra Men, also written as Wat Na Phramen is a historic active Buddhist temple in Phra Nakhon Si Ayutthaya Province. Considered as part of Ayutthaya Historical Park and known as a very beautiful temple.

Overview 
The temple is located along Khlong Sa Bua on the north bank of the Khlong Khu Mueang (the old course of Lopburi River) just opposite the Ayutthaya Royal Grand Palace. Its location can be considered outside the Ayutthaya Island. Previously known as "Wat Phra Merurachikaram" (วัดหน้าพระเมรุราชิการาม).

The temple was built since the time when Ayutthaya was the capital without knowing who built it and the exact year of creation. The name "Na Phra Men", literally translated as "in front of royal cremation", hence it is assumed that it was built as a cremation site for nobility or royal family in the Ayutthaya period.

Wat Na Phra Men is one of the few temples in the Ayutthaya Historical Park that were not burned by the Ava troops during the fall of Ayutthaya in 1767. The temple is therefore still able to maintain its exquisite condition after many renovations during the Rattanakosin period.

The outstanding construction is the ubosot (ordination hall)'s gable is featuring Lord Vishnu mounted on garuda, on top of the demon Rāhu placed between two nāgas and flanked by 26 devas.

Inside there are octagonal columns. The top of the columns were made in the form of closed lotuses to support the large roof. The ceiling was decorated with carved wood and coloured glasses showing the meaning of beautiful stars in the celestial.

The principal Buddha image is seated in the gesture of subduing Māra, and wears royal attire. Its name was given by King Rama III.

Another principal Buddha image is "Phra Khanthararaj" (พระคันธารราฐ), which is enshrined inside the viharn noi (chapel) beside the ubosot. It is a green stone Buddha image that is presumed to be more than 1,500 years old, from the Dvaravati period. Considered as one of five seated Buddha images in this type in Thailand which is worth preserved.

The temple is now a recognised ancient monument since 1935 by the Fine Arts Department.

Gallery

See also 
Ayutthaya Historical Park
Thai Buddhist sculpture

References 

Tourist attractions in Phra Nakhon Si Ayutthaya province
Registered ancient monuments in Thailand
Buddhist temples in Phra Nakhon Si Ayutthaya Province
Thai Theravada Buddhist temples and monasteries